

Ion Creangă (born 1883 in Corjova) was a Bessarabian politician.

Biography 

He served as Member of the Moldovan Parliament (1917–1918). He also worked as teacher in Dubăsari.

Gallery

Bibliography 
Gheorghe E. Cojocaru, Sfatul Țării: itinerar, Civitas, Chişinău, 1998, 
Mihai Taşcă, Sfatul Țării şi actualele autorităţi locale, "Timpul de dimineaţă", no. 114 (849), June 27, 2008 (page 16)

External links 
 Arhiva pentru Sfatul Tarii
 Deputaţii Sfatului Ţării şi Lavrenti Beria

Notes

1883 births
Year of death missing
Moldovan MPs 1917–1918
People from Corjova, Dubăsari